Enmarket Arena is a multi-purpose complex in Savannah, Georgia, United States. It opened in February 2022 with a 9,500-seat arena, including twelve luxury suites, five lodge boxes, and a party suite. Enmarket Arena is the home to the Savannah Ghost Pirates of the ECHL.

History 
The possibility of a new arena in Savannah was discussed for around 20 years before the announcement of the Enmarket Arena. Discussions began about replacing the Savannah Civic Center started in 2001.

In fall 2018, the City of Savannah announced plans for the construction of a new arena in the westside to replace the Martin Luther King, Jr. Arena at the Savannah Civic Center. In September 2019, the proposed new arena broke ground. In January 2021, the ECHL approved a 2022–23 season expansion team to play out of the new arena. In July 2021, the convenience store chain Enmarket secured the naming rights to the arena to be named Enmarket Arena.

The arena's parking lots are not expected to be completed in time for the arena's opening, and as such a temporary parking plan will be established.

In January 2022, a delay was announced due to the ongoing supply chain crisis, construction issues, and the coronavirus pandemic. Shows were postponed until early February.

The Ghost Pirates' first game at Enmarket Arena took place on November 5, 2022, with a 5–1 victory over the Greenville Swamp Rabbits.

Events

Professional wrestling 
Professional wrestling promotion All Elite Wrestling held an event at the arena on July 13, 2022, which included tapings for that week's episodes of their television programs AEW Dynamite and AEW Rampage.

References

Indoor arenas in Georgia (U.S. state)
Indoor ice hockey venues in the United States
Sports venues in Savannah, Georgia
Multi-purpose stadiums in the United States